Wendy Lee (born 5 November 1960) is a Canadian former swimmer. She competed in the women's 400 metre freestyle at the 1976 Summer Olympics.

References

External links
 

1960 births
Living people
Olympic swimmers of Canada
Swimmers at the 1976 Summer Olympics
Swimmers from Vancouver
Canadian female freestyle swimmers